Rossland was the name of a provincial electoral district in the Canadian province of British Columbia located in the West Kootenay region.  It is named after the town of Rossland, near Trail, B.C.  It made its first appearance on the hustings in the election of 1916 .  Its predecessor riding was Rossland City (1903–1912) and from 1924 it was succeeded by the riding of Rossland-Trail.

For other current and historical electoral districts in the Kootenay region, please see Kootenay (electoral districts).

Electoral history 
Note:  Winners of each election are in bold.

|Liberal
|William David Willson
|align="right"|424
|align="right"|55.79%
|align="right"|
|align="right"|unknown
|- bgcolor="white"
!align="right" colspan=3|Total valid votes
!align="right"|760
!align="right"|100.00%
!align="right"|
|- bgcolor="white"
!align="right" colspan=3|Total rejected ballots
!align="right"|
!align="right"|
!align="right"|
|- bgcolor="white"
!align="right" colspan=3|Turnout
!align="right"|%
!align="right"|
!align="right"|
|- bgcolor="white"
!align="right" colspan=7|1 Parr may have been a Labour candidate although Gosnell labels him a Liberal; he may have campaigned as both.
|}
		

 
|Federated Labour Party 1
|George Alexander Dingwall
|align="right"|239 	
|align="right"|35.36	%
|align="right"|
|align="right"|unknown

|Liberal
|John Allan McLeod
|align="right"|180 		
|align="right"|26.63%
|align="right"|
|align="right"|unknown
|- bgcolor="white"
!align="right" colspan=3|Total valid votes
!align="right"|676 
!align="right"|100.00%
!align="right"|
|- bgcolor="white"
!align="right" colspan=3|Total rejected ballots
!align="right"|
!align="right"|
!align="right"|
|- bgcolor="white"
!align="right" colspan=3|Turnout
!align="right"|%
!align="right"|
!align="right"|
|- bgcolor="white"
!align="right" colspan=7|1  Also referred to as "Farmer-Labour" because of farmer support.
|}	

Redistribution following the 1920 election resulted in the renaming of the riding to Rossland-Trail for the 1924 election.

Sources 

Elections BC Historical Returns

Former provincial electoral districts of British Columbia